Craig Jones (born 9 April 1972, in Queanbeyan) is an Australian rower who participated in the 2004 Summer Olympic Games in Athens, Greece. He placed eleventh in the men's single sculls event.

Jones placed third in the men's double sculls (M2x) in the 2006 World Rowing Championships.

References

External links
 
 

1972 births
Living people
Australian male rowers
Rowers at the 2004 Summer Olympics
Olympic rowers of Australia
ACT Academy of Sport alumni
People from Queanbeyan
Sportsmen from New South Wales
21st-century Australian people